ViuTVsix is a free-to-air English language general entertainment television channel in Hong Kong operated by HK Television Entertainment (HKTVE), whose parent company, PCCW, also operates IPTV platform Now TV and media streaming service Viu.
The channel offers 17 hours of English programming a day including news and public affairs, lifestyle shows, foreign television series, and documentaries.
 
Unlike HKTVE's main channel ViuTV, its online streaming feed isn't available daily, because of the copyright issue. While the feed is only available for limited times only such as when there are live music and sports events.

History

Pre-launch 
In 2015, HKTVE was awarded a 12-year free-to-air television broadcast license by the Hong Kong Government. Under the regulation of the license, the company must have an English-speaking channel with 16-hour of programming by 31 March 2017. Until the launch, the channel was originally planned to have 17 hours of programming a day under the format of SDTV. 
 
On 11 October 2016, The channel name ViuTVsix is revealed and announced the launch date, 31 March 2017, on their 2017 programme preview ViuTV 2017.

Programming 

It airs news, imported television series, factual television and documentary (some programs were bought from ITV Studios, Fremantle, Sony Pictures Television, Universal Television, ABC Signature and other production unit). Along with some live sports and music events, such as Hong Kong Sevens and BBC Music Awards.

Children's programming
They're imported cartoons mostly from Nickelodeon, Universal Kids, Nelvana, Entertainment One, FremantleMedia Kids and Family (now Boat Rocker Media) and Allspark(now Entertainment One) with additional shows from non-english speaking countries or online steaming platforms such as Lost in Oz, and The Fixies.

News, politics and finance 
From launch to 2020, Any news bulletin on ViuTVsix wasn't produced by Now TV's news division, Instead, its main newscast ViuTV News and talk show Weekly Re-Viu were produced Reuters. As of 2020, ViuTV News and Weekly Re-Viu are produced by its own news division as the decline of its cooperation with Reuters.

ViuTVsix also relays live newscast from the international news broadcasters around the world, such as Al Jazeera, CNN (Until 2019 onwards), Deutsche Welle, and NHK World, with ABC's news magazine 20/20.

From 2019 to 2020, 24K Finance, the only Mandarin Chinese-speaking live financial program, was produced and aired during Hong Kong Stock Trading Days.

See also 
 List of television stations in Hong Kong

References

External links 
 
 

Television channels and stations established in 2017
English-language television stations
2017 establishments in Hong Kong
Television stations in Hong Kong